Meadowhall Interchange is a transport interchange located in north-east Sheffield, consisting of a combined heavy rail station, tram stop and bus and coach station. The second-busiest heavy rail station in the city in terms of passenger numbers, Meadowhall Interchange provides connections between National Rail services, the Sheffield Supertram light rail network, intercity coach services and the city bus network.

The interchange was opened in 1990 by British Rail under the Regional Railways sector, to serve the new Meadowhall shopping centre, which opened at the same time and is connected to the interchange by a pedestrian footbridge. The interchange is now owned by Network Rail and operated by Northern, with additional services provided by TransPennine Express.

History

Previous stations
The first station to be named after the Meadowhall area, Meadowhall and Wincobank, was opened in 1868 by the South Yorkshire Railway on the Blackburn Valley Line from Sheffield Victoria to Barnsley. Meadowhall and Wincobank station closed in 1953 and the track was eventually lifted and converted into a cycle path in 1987, although the station building survives in good condition.

Upon opening in 1990, Meadowhall Interchange effectively replaced Brightside station, located around one mile further down the line towards Sheffield. However, limited services continued to serve Brightside for several years after the opening of Meadowhall Interchange, with Brightside station finally closing in 1995.

Construction and opening

Meadowhall Interchange was constructed to serve the new Meadowhall shopping centre, which opened on 4 September 1990 on the former site of steelworks in the Don Valley in north-east Sheffield. The interchange was constructed to the north of the shopping centre on the opposite bank of the River Don, with a pedestrian suspension bridge linking the interchange with the shopping centre. The heavy rail and bus and coach stations opened in 1990.

The Sheffield Supertram light rail platforms opened on 21 March 1994. The section of line from Meadowhall to Fitzalan Square, in the city centre, was the first phase of the network to open.

Future
Meadowhall Interchange was selected as the initial site for Sheffield's High Speed 2 station, with a high-level viaduct station planned to be constructed parallel to the M1 motorway's Tinsley Viaduct adjacent to the mainline station. However, these plans were eventually dropped, with plans for High Speed 2 services to instead serve Sheffield station in the city centre.

As part of the plans for High Speed 2, proposals were put forward for the construction of a new Supertram line from Meadowhall Interchange to Dore & Totley station in the south-west of the city.

Layout and facilities

Layout

The interchange is located to the north of Meadowhall shopping centre, to which it is connected by a pedestrian footbridge, which provides the main entrance to the interchange. Additionally, entrances are located from Meadowhall Road into the bus station, on Barrow Road from the park and ride car park onto the heavy rail platforms, and from Tyler Street directly from street level onto the main concourse.

The ticket office for National Rail services is located off to the side of the footbridge which connects the interchange with the shopping centre. This footbridge continues over platforms 1 and 2, opening up onto a raised open-air concourse area from which platforms 2 and 3 can be accessed. A further footbridge from this central concourse provides access to platform 4 and the Tyler Street interchange entrance; platform 1 and the Supertram platforms are accessed directly by steps down from the main footbridge, opposite the ticket office.

There are no ticket barriers at the interchange. In addition to the ticket office, several ticket machines are located in the open-air concourse between platforms 2 and 3. The main waiting room, with toilet and baby changing facilities, is located at the end of the light rail platforms, opening onto platform 1, with an additional waiting room provided on platform 2. A park and ride car park is located behind platform 2, with additional parking facilities available around the shopping centre.

A second concourse is located next to the bus and coach station and contains toilets, Travel South Yorkshire ticket purchasing facilities and a number of small shopping outlets.

Platforms
The station is located immediately to the north-east of Station Junction, where the Dearne Valley Line diverges from the Hallam and Penistone Lines. Platforms 1 and 2 are a pair of side platforms located closest to the shopping centre on the Dearne Valley Line. Platforms 3 and 4 are a pair of side platforms located on the other side of the central open-air concourse on the Hallam and Penistone Lines, laid out at a 45 degree angle to platforms 1 and 2.

The light rail platforms, numbered MEI1 and MEI2, are located immediately behind and parallel to platform 1; they are constructed in an island layout. Since the cessation of off-peak Purple Line services to Meadowhall Interchange, most tram services depart from platform MEI1.

There are a total of sixteen stands at the bus and coach station, arranged into four main rows, each accessed by zebra crossings. Row A, consisting of stands A1 to A5, is located alongside the bus station concourse. Row B, consisting of stands B1 and B2, is located as a small island between rows A and C. Row C, consisting of stands C1 to C5, and row D, consisting of stands D1 to D4, are a pair of parallel island rows located at the side of the bus station closest to the heavy rail platforms. The majority of intercity bus and coach services depart from row A, while city bus services depart from rows B, C and D.

Operation

National Rail services
Current off-peak services from the interchange include (in Trains per Hour, tph):

6tph to  only (Northern Trains)

Sheffield Supertram services
Meadowhall Interchange is the terminus of the Sheffield Supertram's Yellow route. Until 25 October 2018, additional services were provided by the Purple route on Sundays, and prior to 2016, during off-peak hours of operation during the week and on Saturdays.

Current off-peak tram services from the interchange consist of five Yellow route trams per hour to Middlewood, via the city centre. Additional services operate during the morning and evening peak to provide a ten-minute frequency.

{{tram line|next=Meadowhall South/Tinsley<small>towards Middlewood</small>|previous=Terminus|route=Yellow Line |col= }}

Bus and coach services

Meadowhall Interchange is located a short distance from Junction 34 of the M1 motorway, meaning it is more conveniently located for intercity coach services than Sheffield Interchange in the city centre. As a result, many coach services for Sheffield call at Meadowhall Interchange instead of the city centre, particularly Megabus services. To link passengers with Sheffield City Centre, there are many bus services between Sheffield Interchange and Meadowhall Interchange, including the express X1 Steel Link, X17 Gold'' and X78 every ten minutes.

Intercity coach services, operated by Flixbus, Megabus and National Express, usually depart from stands A1 and A2, the two stands closest to the shopping centre. Coach service destinations include London, Leeds, Newcastle, Scotland and various airports. Meadowhall Interchange is also a major hub for intercity, local and city bus services operated by Powell's Bus, First South Yorkshire and Stagecoach Yorkshire, including express routes X1, X17 and X78 to Maltby, Barnsley and Doncaster respectively.

The bus station is in the PlusBus scheme, which means that train and bus tickets can be bought together at a saving.  Meadowhall is in the same zone as Sheffield station.

, the stand allocation is:

See also
Sheffield station
Meadowhall shopping centre

References

Railway stations in Sheffield
DfT Category C2 stations
Bus stations in South Yorkshire
Sheffield Supertram stops
Railway stations opened by British Rail
Railway stations in Great Britain opened in 1990
Railway stations served by TransPennine Express
Northern franchise railway stations
High-speed rail in the United Kingdom
Bus transport in Sheffield